George Dudley Morton  was a college football player.

Early years
George Dudley Morton was born c. 1904 in Georgia to John White Morton and Mary Lou Hinton. Morton attended Episcopal High School in Alexandria, Virginia; at the time of his graduation called "the best all-round athlete that The High School has ever produced." He played football, baseball, track and basketball.

College football
Morton was an All-Southern halfback for the Georgia Bulldogs of the University of Georgia, captain of its 1926 team. That year in the rivalry game at Grant Field with Georgia Tech, Georgia found itself down 13 to 0 at the half. Herdis McCrary and Morton led a comeback, winning 14 to 13. In the upset of Vanderbilt in 1925 Morton passed for a touchdown.

References

Year of birth missing
Year of death missing
American football halfbacks
Georgia Bulldogs football players
All-Southern college football players
Episcopal High School (Alexandria, Virginia) alumni
Players of American football from Georgia (U.S. state)